The Discovery Tour may refer to:

 Discovery Tour 1984 - a music tour by British multi-instrumentalist Mike Oldfield
 Discovery Tour (Pet Shop Boys) - a music tour by the British electronic duo Pet Shop Boys